Herbert Stuart Lauriston Scott (29 December 1885 – 3 June 1966) was a British horse rider who competed in the 1912 Summer Olympics. He did not finish the Individual eventing (Military) competition, also the British team did not finish the team event. In the individual jumping event he finished fourth.

References

1885 births
1966 deaths
Equestrians at the 1912 Summer Olympics
Olympic equestrians of Great Britain
British male equestrians
British event riders
British show jumping riders